Tetracamphilius angustifrons is a species of loach catfish found in the Central African Republic and the Democratic Republic of the Congo where it occurs in the Ubangui River. It grows to a length of 3.9 cm and has a relatively elongate snout with an enlarged olfactory organ.

References 

 

Amphiliidae
Freshwater fish of Africa
Fish of the Central African Republic
Fish of the Democratic Republic of the Congo
Fish described in 1902
Taxa named by George Albert Boulenger